Edward William Sanders (born 4 February 1993) is an English actor, singer, and record producer. He is best known for his performance as Tobias Ragg in the 2007 film Sweeney Todd: The Demon Barber of Fleet Street. He was also featured on the film's soundtrack. He also appeared in the historical adventure drama film Hugo in 2011, where he was part of the ensemble.

Early life

Education
Sanders was educated at Copthorne Preparatory School and sat his GCSE Exams at Ardingly College. He then moved up to London and continued his education part-time at Kensington and Chelsea College whilst working as an apprentice in recording studios across London.

Music career

After starting his career in the film industry, Sanders, under the name Eddy Atlantis, spent his teenage years learning and working in London's east end recording studios with a range of artists.

On 31 March 2015 he signed a global publishing deal with Imagem Music UK.

Lokjaw Studios 
At the beginning of 2019, Eddy opened his own studio space, Lokjaw Studios.   Based in Primrose Hill, North West London, it houses various outboard and has a large control room, separate live room and vocal booth.

Production discography

Sync discography

Filmography

Awards and nominations
 Broadcast Film Critics Association Awards - Critics Choice Award for Best Young Actor for his role in Sweeney Todd: The Demon Barber of Fleet Street (2007) (nominated)
 Las Vegas Film Critics Society Awards 2007 - Sierra Award for Youth in Film - Male for his role in Sweeney Todd: The Demon Barber of Fleet Street (2007) (won)
 Phoenix Film Critics Society Awards 2007- PFCS Award for Best Performance by a Youth in a Lead or Supporting Role - Male for his role in Sweeney Todd: The Demon Barber of Fleet Street (2007) (won)
 Young Artist Award 2008 - Best Performance of a Supporting Young Actor in a feature film - Comedy or Musical for his role in Sweeney Todd: The Demon Barber of Fleet Street (2008) (nominated)

References

External links
 
 Eddy Atlantis Discography

1993 births
People educated at Ardingly College
People educated at Copthorne Preparatory School
English male child actors
English male film actors
People from East Sussex
Living people
British record producers
British audio engineers